Brent Clode (born 21 April 1963) is a New Zealand sprint canoer who competed in the late 1980s. He was eliminated in the semifinals of the K-4 1000 m event at the 1988 Summer Olympics in Seoul.

References
Sports-reference.com profile

1963 births
Canoeists at the 1988 Summer Olympics
Living people
New Zealand male canoeists
Olympic canoeists of New Zealand
20th-century New Zealand people
21st-century New Zealand people